Nanubae (Kapagmai, Aunda) is an Arafundi language of Papua New Guinea. It is close to Tapei; the name Alfendio was once used for both.

Locations
Kassell, et al. (2018) list Imanmeri, Wambrumas, and Yamandim as the villages where Nanubae is spoken. Additionally, there are some speakers in Imboin, which also has Tapei speakers.

According to Ethnologue, it is spoken in Imanmeri, Wambrumas, and Yamandim villages of Karawari Rural LLG, East Sepik Province.

References

Arafundi languages
Languages of East Sepik Province